Gertrude Emily Benham (July 1867– February 1938) was an English explorer and mountaineer. Born in London, she was the youngest of six children and began climbing mountains as a girl. She went on to climb mountains on almost every continent. Benham was also an intrepid hiker and walked from Valparaiso, Chile, to Buenos Aires, Argentina. She went on to hike across Kenya, and traverse Africa on foot.

Benham also drew as she travelled, and her drawings were later used in mapping the countries she explored. Benham always traveled alone or with native guides, spending less than 250 British pounds a year. In 1916, she was named a fellow of the Royal Geographic Society. Throughout her life, she climbed more than 300 mountains. Notably, she was the first woman to climb Mt. Kilimanjaro.

Truda Peaks, one of the summits of Mount Rogers in Glacier National Park, in the Selkirk Mountains of British Columbia, Canada, is named in her honour. Her climbing boots are on display in the Plymouth City Museum and Art Gallery.

Travels
Her intention was to climb as many Rocky Mountain peaks as time would permit.

Benham travelled alone, she was aided only by porters. She always carried a Holy Bible, a pocket edition of Shakespeare’s plays, copies of Kipling’s Kim and Blackmore’s Lorna Doone. 

1904: She travelled to Canada, by spring she had already visited Banff, Alberta.
She moved to a chalet on Lake Louise. On 27th June, she made an ascent of Mount Lefroy with Mr Frost and her brothers Hans and Christian Kaufmann as guides. She ascented several other major peaks - Mount Victoria, Mount Stephen, Mount Assiniboine and Mount Balfour - then, transferred to the Selkirk Range where the Truda Peaks are named in her honour.

Accompanied by Christian Kaufmann, she reached the summit of Mount Hejee; She beated Professor Charles Fay, after whom the mountain would subsequently be renamed.

1905: Climbed in the Southern Alps alone,visited Tasmania and Australia, she made her way back to England via Japan, India, Egypt and Corsica.

1908: Second trip around the world, west to east and visiting Japan and California. She disembarked at Valparaíso then crossed the Andes and Pampas to arrive to Buenos Aires.

1909: Central Africa, she arrived to Broken Hill (now Kabwe in Zambia), walked 900 kilometres to Abercorn (= Mbala) near the southern tip of Lake Tanganyika; Proceeded to Uganda and Kenya where she ascended the summit of Mount Kilimanjaro.  

1913: Back in Africa, she disembarked in the Niger delta and made her way to Kano in Nigeria. Her route took her through Cameroon, down the Oubangui, up the Congo to Stanleyville [Kisangani], then through the Ituri forest to Mabarara in Uganda. Diverting west through Rwanda, she ascended Mount Nyiragongo (3470 metres) and reached the crater of an unnamed volcano that had erupted on December 1912.She climbed to the summit of Mount Mulanje. 

1914 : Visited India and ventured for the third time into the Himalaya, she trekked across the mountains and passed to Srinagar in Kashmir.

The war and last years

The war years kept her in England, she established relationships with the Royal Geographical Society (RGS) and the Natural History Museum.

1919: Back in India undertook a remarkable journey through the mountains from Naini Tal, near the western border of Nepal, to Leh in Ladakh.

1921: Back in East Africa, ascended Mount Elgon. Went to Australia and the South Pacific returning to England in October 1923 and ending her fifth trip around the world. 

1924: Back in India, repeatedly pestering the Anglo-Indian administration for permission to enter Tibet by the remote passes to the west of Nepal. 

1926:Started her sixth trip around the world, she visited Natal, Zanzibar, Sudan, Egypt, Syria, India, Malaya and the East Indies.

1927: Arrived to Hong Kong, crossed the Pacific to arrive to California, explored Guatemala,  Belize, the West Indies and Trinidad.

1928: Disembarked at Plymouth, visited Taiwan, Burma (= Myanmar), Celebes, Java and China.

1929: It was her second attempt to gatecrash Tibet and go back in the Himalaya but her permission was not granted.

1931: She tried again to enter the Himalaya, this time, through the mountains of Kumaun beyond the western border of Nepal. 

1933 :Benham circumnavigated the globe a seventh time, sailing via Hong Kong and Los Angeles, and coasting South America with stops at Mollendo (in Peru) and Valparaíso (in Chile).

1934: Benham Collection was presented by Benham in 1934 to the Plymouth City Museum and Art Gallery. Her collection consisted of hundreds of items like jewellery, costumes, accessories, metalwork, lacquer ware, ceramics, toys and religious articles.

1935 : Her "last journey" ,she went to New Hebrides (Vanuatu), New Zealand and returned via Hong Kong and India.

1937: Boarded a ship to South Africa.

Death and Collection

Gertrude died in 1938 on board a ship bound from Africa to England.She was buried at sea.

References

Further reading 

1867 births
1938 deaths
English explorers
English mountain climbers
Female climbers
Hikers